Brainstorm is the second major release by Mitchel Musso. It was released on November 22, 2010 by 717 Records. Musso worked with his brother, Mason Musso, for the project.

Track listing

Mitchel Musso albums
2010 EPs